(died 747) was an Alid leader who led a rebellion against the Umayyad Caliphate at Kufa and later Persia during the Third Fitna.

Early life and rise to the imamate
Abd Allah ibn Mu'awiya was a great-grandson of Ali's brother, Ja'far ibn Abi Talib. Following the death of Ali's grandson Abu Hashim in 703, the leadership of the Alid cause was vacant, and several candidates vied for it: one party claimed that Abu Hashim had transferred his rights to the Abbasid Muhammad ibn Ali, while another faction wanted to proclaim Abd Allah ibn Amr al-Kindi as the next imam. The latter, however, proved unsatisfactory, and Abd Allah ibn Mu'awiya was chosen instead.

Abd Allah claimed not only the imamate, but also, according to Karl Vilhelm Zetterstéen, a divine status. Consequently, his followers embraced the concept of reincarnation and rejected the resurrection of the dead.

Rebellion and death
In October 744, Abd Allah and his followers rebelled in Kufa, and joined by other Alid sympathizers (especially Zaydis), took control of the city and expelled its governor. The reaction of the governor of Iraq, Abd Allah ibn Umar ibn Abd al-Aziz, however, was swift, and he marched on Kufa. Most of the citizens deserted the Alid cause, but the Zaydi contingent fought with enough determination to allow Abd Allah to withdraw from Kufa, first to al-Mada'in and thence to Jibal.

Despite his defeat at Kufa, volunteers opposed to the Umayyad regime continued to flock to his banner, including remnants of the Kharijites defeated by Marwan II and some Abbasid followers. Taking advantage of the turmoils of the Third Fitna and the burgeoning Abbasid Revolution in Khurasan, which debilitated the Umayyad government, he managed to extend his control over large parts of Persia, including most of Jibal, Ahvaz, Fars and Kerman. He established his residence first at Isfahan and then at Istakhr.

Finally, Marwan II dispatched an army under Amir ibn Dubara against Abd Allah. The Alid's forces were utterly defeated at Marw al-Shadhan in 747, and his rule over Persia collapsed. Abd Allah himself managed to flee to Khurasan, where the Abbasid leader Abu Muslim executed him.

Some of his followers refused to believe his death, and believed that he would return as the mahdi, forming the sect known as the "Janahiyya". Others, the so-called "Harithites", believed that he was reincarnated in the person of Ishaq ibn Zayd ibn al-Harith al-Ansari.

References

Further reading
 

747 deaths
8th-century executions by the Abbasid Caliphate
Iraq under the Umayyad Caliphate
Medieval history of Iran
Alids
Arab rebels
Year of birth unknown
Rebellions against the Umayyad Caliphate
People of the Third Fitna
Mahdism